The Park City Ice Arena  is an indoor, year-round facility located in Park City, Utah. It is the home arena for the Park City Pioneers, the USA Hockey Senior Elite ice hockey team and multiple Mountain West Hockey League champions.

References

External links

Indoor ice hockey venues in the United States